The Italian reptile fauna totals 58 species (including introduced and naturalised species).
They are listed here in three systematic groups (Sauria, Serpentes, and Testudines) in alphabetical order by scientific name.

Sauria (lizards)
Algyroides fitzingeri – Fitzinger's algyroides  (endemic to Sardinia and Corsica)
Algyroides nigropunctatus – blue-throated keeled lizard 
Anguis fragilis – slowworm 
Archaeolacerta bedriagae – Bedriaga's rock lizard 
Chalcides striatus – western three-toed skink 
Chalcides ocellatus – ocellated skink 
Chamaeleo chamaeleon – Mediterranean chameleon
Cyrtopodion kotschyi – tree gecko 
Euleptes europaea – European leaf-toed gecko 
Hemidactylus turcicus – Mediterranean house gecko 
Lacerta agilis – sand lizard 
Lacerta bilineata – western green lizard 
Lacerta horvathi – Horvath's rock lizard 
Lacerta viridis – European green lizard 
Podarcis filfolensis – Filfola lizard 
Podarcis melisellensis – Dalmatian wall lizard 
Podarcis muralis – common wall lizard 
Podarcis raffonei – Aeolian wall lizard 
Podarcis siculus – Italian wall lizard 
Podarcis tiliguerta – Tyrrhenian wall lizard 
Podarcis waglerianus – Sicilian wall lizard  (endemic to Sicily)
Psammodromus algirus – large psammodromus 
Pseudopus apodus – European legless lizard, sheltopusik 
Tarentola mauritanica – Moorish wall gecko 
Timon lepidus – ocellated lizard 
Zootoca vivipara – viviparous lizard

Serpentes (snakes)
 
Coronella austriaca – smooth snake 
Coronella girondica – Riccioli's snake, southern smooth snake 
Elaphe quatuorlineata – four-lined snake 
Eryx jaculus - javelin sand boa  
Hemorrhois hippocrepis – horseshoe whip snake 
Hierophis gemonensis - Balkan whip snake 
Hierophis viridiflavus - green whip snake 
Macroprotodon cucullatus – false smooth snake 
Malpolon monspessulanus – Montpellier snake 
Natrix maura – viperine snake 
Natrix natrix – grass snake 
Natrix tessellata – dice snake 
Telescopus fallax – European cat snake 
Vipera (Rhinaspis) ammodytes – horned viper 
Vipera (Rhinaspis) aspis – asp viper 
Vipera (Pelias) berus – European adder 
Vipera (Acridophaga) ursinii – Orsini's viper 
Vipera walser -  Walser's viper
Zamenis lineatus – Italian Aesculapian snake  (endemic to Italy)
Zamenis longissimus – Aesculapian snake 
Zamenis situla – European ratsnake

Testudines (turtles and tortoises)

Caretta caretta – loggerhead sea turtle  
Chelonia mydas – green sea turtle  
Chelydra serpentina – common snapping turtle (introduced)
Dermochelys coriacea – leatherback sea turtle  
Emys orbicularis orbicularis – European pond turtle  
Emys orbicularis galloitalica – Franco-Italian pond turtle
Emys orbicularis hellenica – Hellenic pond turtle
Emys orbicularis ingauna – Ligurian pond turtle
Emys trinacris – Sicilian pond turtle  
Lepidochelys kempii – Kemp's ridley sea turtle  
Testudo graeca – spur-thighed tortoise  
Testudo hermanni – Hermann's tortoise  
Testudo marginata – marginated tortoise  
Trachemys scripta elegans – red-eared slider  (introduced)

References 

Reptiles
Italy
Italy
Reptiles